Andrés González may refer to:

Andrés González (bishop) (1634–1709), Roman Catholic bishop
Andrés González (Colombian footballer) (born 1984), Colombian footballer
Andrés González (gymnast) (born 1945), Cuban Olympic gymnast
Andrés José González (born 1989), Argentine swimmer
Andrés González (Spanish footballer) (born 1988), Spanish footballer
Andrés González (Peruvian footballer)
Andrés González Díaz (born 1955), Colombian diplomat
Universo 2000 (Andrés Reyes González, 1963–2018), Mexican wrestler
Andrés Alfonso González (born 1990), Venezuelan footballer